Gonzalo Pizzichillo Quintana (born 20 June 1984) is a Uruguayan footballer who plays as a striker for C.D. Suchitepéquez in the Liga Nacional de Guatemala.

Career
Born in Paysandú, Pizzichillo has played in his home country for Peñarol, Central Español, Rampla Juniors, Montevideo Wanderers and Juventud. He was playing in the Mexican second division for Irapuato FC before joining Ecuadorian Serie A side Olmedo in 2010.

Pizzichillo signed for Cúcuta Deportivo in 2013.

Teams
  Peñarol 2004-2006
  Central Español 2006
  Rampla Juniors 2007
  Olbia 2007
  Vaduz 2008
  Montevideo Wanderers 2008
  Juventud 2008-2009
  Irapuato 2009-2010
  Olmedo 2010-2011
  El Tanque Sisley 2011-2012
  Suchitepéquez 2012–present

References

External links
 
 
 Gonzalo Pizzichillo at playmakerstats.com (English version of ceroacero.es)

1984 births
Living people
Uruguayan footballers
Uruguayan expatriate footballers
Uruguayan Primera División players
Ecuadorian Serie A players
Peñarol players
El Tanque Sisley players
FC Vaduz players
Montevideo Wanderers F.C. players
Rampla Juniors players
Juventud de Las Piedras players
Irapuato F.C. footballers
Cúcuta Deportivo footballers
Expatriate footballers in Colombia
Expatriate footballers in Ecuador
Expatriate footballers in Mexico
Expatriate footballers in Italy
Expatriate footballers in Liechtenstein
Expatriate footballers in Guatemala
Uruguayan expatriate sportspeople in Colombia
Uruguayan expatriate sportspeople in Ecuador
Uruguayan expatriate sportspeople in Mexico
Uruguayan expatriate sportspeople in Italy
Uruguayan expatriate sportspeople in Liechtenstein
Uruguayan expatriate sportspeople in Guatemala
Association football forwards
Footballers from Paysandú